Henry Máximo Vizcaíno Monteliel (born 16 May 1980 in Santa Clara, Villa Clara) is a Cuban sprinter who specializes in the 100 metres. His personal best time over 100 m is 10.18 seconds, achieved in July 2007 in Rio de Janeiro.

Career
He finished eighth in the 60 metres at the 2006 IAAF World Indoor Championships in Moscow. He also competed at the 2007 World Championships, the 2008 World Indoor Championships and the 2008 Olympic Games without reaching the final. However, in Beijing he qualified for the second round after finishing fourth in his heat behind Usain Bolt, Daniel Bailey and Vicente de Lima. His time of 10.28 was the second fastest losing time after the 10.25 of Nobuharu Asahara, advancing them to the second round. In that second round he only came to 10.33 seconds, which was the fifth time of the heat, causing elimination.

Personal best
100 m: 10.18 s –  Rio de Janeiro, 23 July 2007
200 m: 20.91 s –  Cali, 5 July 2008

Competition record

References

External links

Cuba in Beijing

Tilastopaja biography

1980 births
Living people
Cuban male sprinters
Athletes (track and field) at the 2008 Summer Olympics
Olympic athletes of Cuba
Athletes (track and field) at the 2007 Pan American Games
Pan American Games competitors for Cuba
People from Santa Clara, Cuba
20th-century Cuban people
21st-century Cuban people